Edwardsiidae is a family of sea anemones. Edwardsiids have long thin bodies and live buried in sediments or in holes or crevices in rock.

Genera
The following genera are recognized within the family Edwardsiidae.
 Drillactis Verrill, 1922
 Edwardsia Quatrefages, 1842
 Edwardsianthus England, 1987
 Edwardsiella Andres, 1883
 Halcampogeton Carlgren, 1937
 Isoedwardsia Carlgren, 1900
 Milne-Edwardsia Carlgren, 1892
 Nematostella Stephenson, 1935
 Paraedwardsia Carlgren in Nordgaard, 1905
 Scolanthus Gosse, 1853
 Synhalcampella
 Tempuractis

References

 
Actiniaria
Cnidarian families
Taxa named by Angelo Andres